Darvish Fakhr (born 1969) is an Iranian American artist born in Newfoundland. He is an artist in the field of Iranian portrait paintings.

Biography 
Born in 1969, Fakhr grew up in the U.S. before moving to Britain where his practice has been based for the last two decades.

Fakhr trained at the School of the Museum of Fine Arts, Boston and the Slade School of Fine Art in London. In 2004 he won the BP Travel Award and used the opportunity to go to Iran and paint local people in Tehran and Isfahan.

Fakhr's paintings show the depths of emotion behind outwardly ritualised lives and aim to help us understand the common humanity that links the Western world and the Middle East. He explores the relationship between shared memory and the passage of time, looking both to the past and the future. He currently lives in Brighton, Sussex.

Exhibitions

 2014 "Palimpsest" Edge of Arabia, London 
 2013 "Farce" Aun Gallery, Tehran 
 2011 "Safar" Aun Gallery, Tehran 
 2008 Commissioned by Jerwood Gallery to paint Akram Khan. The nine piece panel is now part of the permanent collection at the National Portrait Gallery, London.
 2007 "Embodiment" group show- Signal Gallery, Hoxton, London
 2006 Included in Publication, "The Portrait Now" by Sandy Nairne and Sarah Howgate
 2003 Royal Society of Portrait Painters, Mall Galleries, London
 2003 Quod Art Gallery, Brighton
 2002 Chelsea Art Fair, London
 2001 Medici Gallery, Piccadilly, London
 2001 Discerning Eye, Mall Galleries, London
 2001 Royal West of England Academy, 3rd Place, Bristol
 1998 Exhibition of Portraits at Blue Gallery, Chelsea
 1997 Degree Show, Slade School of Fine Art
 1993 Annual Boit Competition, Museum School, Boston, Mass.

Awards
 2007 BP Award- National Portrait Gallery, London and Edinburgh
 2006 BP Award- National Portrait Gallery, London and Aberdeen
 2005 BP Travel Award Show, National Portrait Gallery, London and Edinburgh
 2004 Winner of BP Travel Award, National Portrait Gallery, London
 2000 BP Award – National Portrait Gallery, London and Aberdeen
 1999 BP Award – National Portrait Gallery, London and Aberdeen
 1998 BP Award – National Portrait Gallery, London and Aberdeen

See also 
 Islamic art
 Iranian art
 Islamic calligraphy
 List of Iranian artists
 Modern and contemporary art in Iran

References

External links
 Reorient Magazine
 BP Art Awards 2004

Iranian painters
American artists
1969 births
Living people